Alan James Hawley (born 7 June 1946) is an English former professional footballer who played in the Football League as a right back. He made over 340 appearances for Brentford and was added to the club's Hall of Fame in 2013.

Playing career

Brentford 
Hawley began his career at Fourth Division club Brentford as an apprentice in June 1962, earning £7 a week. When he made his debut at home to Barrow on 29 September 1962 at the age of 16 years, 3 months and 22 days, Hawley was the youngest player to make his debut for Brentford, but he was unable to break into the team on a regular basis. Hawley had to wait until the 1964–65 season to make his breakthrough and won his first piece of silverware, the London Challenge Cup. Either side of a long spell out with a cartilage problem, Hawley was an ever-present during the 1967–68 and 1969–70 seasons.

After a period on the transfer list, the highlight of Hawley's career came during the 1971–72 season, when he helped the club to a third-place finish, which saw the Bees promoted to the Third Division. He succeeded Bobby Ross as captain of the club in 1972 and was awarded a testimonial in May 1974 against Leyton Orient, earning him £1,732. Hawley departed the club at the end of the 1973–74 season, having made 343 appearances and scored four goals for the club. Hawley was added to the Brentford Hall of Fame in 2013, alongside fellow inductees and former teammates Jackie Graham and Bobby Ross.

Loans 
Having gradually fallen out of favour at Griffin Park, Hawley spent time on loan at Fulham (1971), Hillingdon Borough and Aldershot (1974).

Non-League football 
After his departure from Brentford, Hawley played on in non-League football for Hillingdon Borough, Wimbledon, Kingstonian, Walton & Hersham and Ruislip Manor.

Managerial and coaching career 
Hawley was named as caretaker manager of Southern League Premier Division club Hillingdon Borough in August 1975 and was named player-manager the following month. He remained in the role until his dismissal in November 1976. Hawley returned to Brentford in the early 1990s, working under Joe Gadston in the club's youth system.

Personal life 
Hawley is married with two sons and a daughter. After retiring from football, he taught at the London Oratory School and met his now wife, who owned a fish and chip shop. After a period working at Heathrow Airport and at a second fish and chip shop in Earls Court, Hawley began working full-time in the shops. He and his wife took over the running of the Hi-Tide fish and chip shop in Aylesbury in 1997.

Career statistics

Honours 
Brentford
Football League Fourth Division third-place promotion: 1971–72
London Challenge Cup: 1964–65

Individual

 Brentford Hall of Fame

References

1946 births
Living people
Sportspeople from Woking
English footballers
Association football defenders
Brentford F.C. players
Hillingdon Borough F.C. players
Wimbledon F.C. players
Walton & Hersham F.C. players
English Football League players
Southern Football League players
Southern Football League managers
Hillingdon Borough F.C. managers
Kingstonian F.C. players
Tokyngton Manor F.C. players
Brentford F.C. non-playing staff
Schoolteachers from Surrey
English football managers